Twilight is the debut studio album of the Gothic metal band Erben der Schöpfung.

Prelude
"Twilight" turned out to be an Electro, Gothic metal album with classical female vocals. Lyricwise Erben der Schöpfung concentrated on topics as death and ageing. Also a poem of Georg Trakl named "An den Knaben Elis" was processed in the song "Elis".

Track listing
Elis (5:53)
Sleep and Death (5:00)
By My Side (5:05)
Eine Rose für den Abschied (5:49)
Niemand kennt den Tod (5:44)
My Star (6:32)
Ade (5:52)
Alone (5:52)
Doch sie wartet vergebens... (4:52)

Release
First release was on December 7, 2001 under the label M.O.S. Records ltd. which was coupled with a single release of the track "Elis". After signing by Napalm Records, there was a re-release on 13 August 2003.

References

External links
 Erben der Schöpfung

2001 debut albums
Erben der Schöpfung albums
Albums produced by Alexander Krull